Sethubandhanam at Sreeraman Chira or Chira kettal is a Hindu ceremony reminiscent of the Sethubandhanam where Hanuman and his army built Rama Setu to reach Sri Lanka and rescue Sita from the Rakshasa King, Ravana. It is annually conducted at Sreeraman Chira, a 900 hectares of paddy fields situated in Chemmappilly near Triprayar of Thrissur district of Kerala state in India.

Binding of the bund
The Chira kettal (binding of the bund) is a sacred religious ceremony performed by a team of priest from Thriprayar Temple. When the ceremony happens, Thriprayar Temple is closed early after performing the Deeparadhana (Evening pooja) and Athazhapooja (Night pooja). Earlier workers who build chira belonged to the backward Vettuva community and the performance of pooja is done by Brahmins. It is believed that after finishing the poojas of Thriprayar Temple, the God Thriprayar Thevar comes to the river in front of the temple and goes upon a crocodile to the place of ceremony. At this time one can see a number strong waves in the river as a symbol of god's movement. It is also believed that a heavy rain will come on this day which will fill the entire areas of paddy field of Sreeraman Chira with water.

Date
The temple observes Sethubandhanam in Thiruvonam day of Malayalam month Kanni (September - October) in every year.

See also
 Shree Rama Temple

References

 

Religious festivals in India
Hindu festivals